Bathybates ferox is a species of fish in the family Cichlidae. It is found in Burundi, the Democratic Republic of the Congo, Tanzania, and Zambia. Its natural habitat is Lake Tanganyika where it lives in shallow water and is exclusively piscivorous. The IUCN has assessed it as being a "least-concern species".

Description
Bathybates ferox is a fairly deep-bodied cichlid with a silvery body with blue markings. The mouth is large and the teeth are sharp and conical.

Distribution
Bathybates ferox is endemic to Lake Tanganyika, being found in the Democratic Republic of Congo, Burundi, Tanzania and Zambia. It is sometimes found in the aquarium industry where it is considered very passive and easy to keep if maintained to themselves and with very few to no decorations in the aquarium.

Ecology
Bathybates ferox is a piscivore, chasing and feeding on smaller fish. Like other cichlids, Bathybates ferox is a mouth-brooder.

Status
Bathybates ferox is found only in Lake Tanganyika where it is described as widespread and abundant. No specific threats have been identified, and the main threats it faces are from the lowering of the water quality due to pollution, disturbance to the habitat and over-fishing. The International Union for Conservation of Nature has classified the conservation status of this fish as being of "least concern".

References

ferox
Taxa named by George Albert Boulenger
Fish described in 1898
Fish of Lake Tanganyika
Fish of Burundi
Fish of the Democratic Republic of the Congo
Fish of Tanzania
Fish of Zambia
Taxonomy articles created by Polbot